The 2017 Nordic Opening or the sixth Ruka Triple was the 8th edition of the Nordic Opening, an annual cross-country skiing mini-tour event. The three-day event was the first competition round of the 2017–18 FIS Cross-Country World Cup.

World Cup points distribution 
The winners of the overall standings were awarded 200 World Cup points and the winners of each of the three stages were awarded 50 World Cup points.

A total of 350 points was possible to achieve if one athlete won all three stages and the overall standings.

Overall standings

Overall leadership by stage

References 

2017–18 FIS Cross-Country World Cup
2017
2017 in cross-country skiing
November 2017 sports events in Europe
December 2017 sports events in Europe